Pele were an English indie rock band, formed in Ellesmere Port, Cheshire, England in 1990, by the guitarist and frontman Ian Prowse and keyboard player Andrew Roberts. They were joined by Dally on drums, Jimmy McAllister on bass guitar and finally Nico on violin. Despite never reaching the Top 40 of the UK Singles Chart, the band built up a loyal live following, but split in 1995 due to a legal wrangle with their record label.

Biography
After gigging around Chester and Liverpool, the band were signed to Polgram backed label M&G Records, after their head of A&R heard a demo of "Megalomania". Within weeks the band set about recording their debut album, Fireworks, at the Metropolis recording studios in London, with record producer, Gary Langan.

As the album took shape, "Raid the Palace" was released as the first single. In the week after release, Pele began a tour at Kingston University, which culminated at the (University of Wales) in 1995, and included gigs across Europe. In February 1992, their second single, "Megalomania", was released, but failed to reach the Top 40 of the UK Singles Chart. The single also hit No. 1 in South Africa as well as charting in Portugal. The third single from the album was "Fair Blows the Wind for France", which also failed to hit the Top 40.

Tours with Del Amitri and The Pogues followed, before the band used the Rockfield Studios in Wales to record the follow-up album with producer Jon Kelly. "Fat Black Heart" was the band's first single off that album, and again, failed to break the UK Top 40. "Don't Worship Me" was Pele's sixth single - (a hit in the Netherlands and Germany) and was followed in early December by the Sport of Kings album.

The situation between the band and their record label deteriorated.  Despite the live album, A-Live A-Live-O, legal threats and the record label's ultimate bankruptcy, led to the band splitting up. Prowse formed Amsterdam, who released their debut album in 2005 and reached the UK Singles Chart Top 40 in the same year with their song "The Journey".

In July and August 2009, Pele played two reunion gigs in Liverpool, and London, whilst a final reunion show at the Cavern Club took place in December 2009. Ian Prowse has recently toured the Fireworks album as part of a 25th anniversary re-release. A 25th anniversary of Sport Of Kings album has also been announced for early 2018.

Discography

Albums
 Fireworks (April 1992)
 Sport of Kings (December 1993)
 A-Live A-Live O (June 1994)
 This Time Next Year (December 2001)

Singles
"Raid the Palace" (October 1991)
"Megalomania" (February 1992) - UK No. 73
"Fair Blows the Wind for France" (June 1992) - UK No. 62
"Fireworks" (September 1992)
"Fat Black Heart" (July 1993) - UK No. 75
"Don't Worship Me" (November 1993)

References

External links
 Official Pele website
 Pele on Myspace

English rock music groups
Musical groups established in 1990
Musical groups disestablished in 1996
People from Ellesmere Port